Sonar Khancha is a 1973 film that was directed by Agradoot Music of the film was composed by Bireshwar Sarkar. Uttam Kumar, Aparna Sen and Tarun Kumar played the lead roles.

Cast
 Haradhan Bandyopadhyay
 Subrata Chatterjee 
 Sulata Chowdhury 
 Aparna Sen
 Uttam Kumar
 Tarun Kumar Chatterjee

Soundtrack

References

External links
 

1973 films
Bengali-language Indian films
1970s Bengali-language films